Necklacepod is a common name for several plants and may refer to:

Sophora tomentosa
Styphnolobium